Ab Bidak-e Zilayi (also Romanized as Āb Bīdak-e Zīlāyī; also known as Āb Bīdak) is a village in Zilayi Rural District, Margown District, Boyer-Ahmad County, Kohgiluyeh and Boyer-Ahmad Province, Iran. At the 2006 census, its population was 218, in 43 families.

References 

Populated places in Boyer-Ahmad County